Roger Snipes (born 5 February 1979) is a British bodybuilder, Fitness model, fitness competitor and fitness trainer. He is winner of Mr. UK, Mr. Britannia in 2010 and Fame UK in 2011. He followed it up with a win at Musclemania 2011. He won the WBFF European Championship in 2013 and took second place in the WBFF World Championship 2015. He has been a Shredz, PhD athlete and WBFF Pro Muscle Model.
Team Physique Global

Early life 
Snipes was born in the North Middlesex Hospital, Edmonton and grew up in Tottenham city of London. He was a sport athlete in his young age, where he competed in many track events at different stadiums around London and was a part of an athletic group called the Young Socialists.

Career 
Snipes won his debut competition the Mister UK in July 2010. He has competed male pageant the Mr. Britannia in 2010  and stood first place and won the Fame UK in 2011. Snipes won the Musclemania, Qualifier 1st  place under 85 kg Body Building. He completed the Musclemania British Championship final, First place and Overall Winner gaining a Pro card. After Musclemania stage winning the heavy weight class in a qualifier, he obtained sponsorship by PhD Nutrition, a leading supplement and nutrition brand in UK. He had seen a huge influx of fitness competitors joining a federation called World Beauty Fitness & Fashion (WBFF). Snipes helped with Musclemania European and Commonwealth championship by answering some Q&A's and constructing a choreographed routine with a fellow athlete in 2012 . In November 2013, he competed as a Muscle Model and took first place in WBFF European Championship and also won his pro card. Snipes stood in second place in the 2015 WBFF World Championship.

With the building success Snipes has been interviewed and featured by magazines like Ultra Fit, Fabulous Magazine, Muscle and Fitness, Men's Health, ShortList, Healthy for Men and Men's Fitness etc.

Fitness Education 
Snipes also conducted a fitness educational seminar in Hyderabad, India

Statistics 
 Height: 5'ft 11 inch
 Weight: 199 lbs
 Neck: 17
 Chest: 46
 Waist: 32

Contest history/Competitive Placings 
 Mr. UK 2010, 1st place - Model
 Mr. Britannia 2010, 1st place - Model
 Muscle mania 2011, Qualifier 1st  place  - under 85 kg Body Building
 Fame UK 2011/Miami pro – 1st place -  Muscle model
 Musclemania British championship final – 1st place and Overall -  over 85 kg- Body Building
 Musclemania Universe – Top 10 – Heavy weight -  Body building
 WBFF European Championship 2013, 1st Place – Muscle model
 WBFF World Championship 2015,  2nd place – Muscle Model

See also 
 List of British bodybuilders
 List of male professional bodybuilders

References

External links
 

Fitness and figure competitors
Living people
1979 births
English bodybuilders
Professional bodybuilders
Black British sportsmen
English strength athletes